Clythraschema chabrillacii is a species of beetle in the family Cerambycidae, and the only species in the genus Clythraschema. It was described by Thomson in 1857.

References

Hemilophini
Beetles described in 1857